Twenty Questions was a Canadian television game show, which aired on CTV in the 1961–62 television season. Produced by CJAY-TV in Winnipeg and hosted by Stewart MacPherson, the show was an adaptation of the earlier American game show Twenty Questions.

Panelists on the show included Rassy Ragland, the mother of Neil Young.

Twenty Questions was broadcast on Wednesday evenings, 19:30 in Toronto, beginning 4 October 1961. The program lasted only a single season on CTV. MacPherson, who had previously hosted a radio version of the show in Britain,  subsequently went on to host a British adaptation of Twenty Questions for Associated-Rediffusion.

Les Wedman, television columnist for The Vancouver Sun, deemed the production to be a "dull, witless presentation of a parlor [sic] game".

References

External links
 Twenty Questions at the Canadian Communications Foundation

1960s Canadian game shows
CTV Television Network original programming
1961 Canadian television series debuts
1962 Canadian television series endings
Television shows filmed in Winnipeg
Television game shows with incorrect disambiguation